Conor Sloan (born February 25, 1998) is an American college soccer player who plays for Furman University as a forward.

Career
On February 4, 2016, it was announced that Sloan would play college soccer at Furman University. He also appeared for United Soccer League side Charleston Battery on an amateur contract, as not to make him ineligible for college soccer.

References

External links

Furman Profile

1998 births
Living people
American soccer players
Furman Paladins men's soccer players
Charleston Battery players
Association football forwards
Soccer players from South Carolina
USL Championship players
People from Murrells Inlet, South Carolina